Chen Hao may refer to:
 Chen Hao (politician) (born 1954), Secretary of Yunnan Provincial Committee of CPC
 Moses Chan (born 1971), Hong Kong actor
 Chen Hao (actress) (born 1979), Chinese actress and model
 Chen Hao (baseball) (born 1990), Chinese baseball outfielder for the Jiangsu Hopestars
 Chen Hao (footballer, born 1993), Chinese footballer
 Chen Hao (footballer, born 2002), Chinese-Hong Kong footballer